The Kyrgyzstan national futsal team represents Kyrgyzstan in international futsal competitions and is controlled by the Kyrgyz Football Union.

Kyrgyzstan has yet to participate in the FIFA Futsal World Cup. Their closest attempt came in 2016, when they had won Japan but then lost to Australia in the fifth-place match of the 2016 AFC Futsal Championship.

Competition records

FIFA Futsal World Cup

AFC Futsal Championship

Futsal at the Asian Indoor and Martial Arts Games

Tulpar Cup
 2008: -  Third Place

Baltika Cup
 2007 -  Champions

ELF Cup
 2006 -  Third Place

In 2006, Kyrgyzstan took part in the inaugural ELF Cup in Northern Cyprus. This competition was originally intended to be for teams that were not members of FIFA; however, the organisers extended invitations to both Kyrgyzstan and Tajikistan, who were both represented by their national futsal teams.

Players

Current squad
Players called for the 2018 AFC Futsal Championship.

Previous squads

AFC Futsal Championship
2018 AFC Futsal Championship squads

All-time record vs opponents

References

External links
Baltika Cup

Asian national futsal teams
Futsal
National